"First Time" is a song by European-American pop group The Kelly Family. It was produced by Kathy Kelly and Hartmut Pfannmüller for their eighth regular studio album Over the Hump (1994) and features lead vocals by Patricia Kelly who co-wrote the song. "First Time" was released as the album's fourth and final single in 1995.

Track listings

Credits and personnel 
Credits adapted from the liner notes of Over the Hump.

Songwriting – The Kelly Family
Production – Hartmut Pfannmüller, Kathy Kelly
Executive production – Dan Kelly, Mike Ungefehr
Engineering – Günther Kasper

Charts

References

External links
 KellyFamily.de — official site

1995 songs
The Kelly Family songs